Saint Amalberga of Maubeuge (also  Amalia, or Amelia of Lobbes or Binche) was a Merovingian nun and saint who lived in the 7th century.

Narrative
Amalberga's father was Saint Geremarus. 
She was born in Brabant. She is said to have been the niece of Pippin of Landen and married Count Witger, Duke of Lorraine. In her biography she is presented as the mother of five saints: Emebert, Reineldis, Pharaildis, Ermelindis and Gudula.  

Sometime after the birth of their youngest child, Gudula, Witger decided to become a Benedictine in Lobbes; Amalberga joined the Benedictine nuns of Maubeuge.

Her feast is celebrated on July 10. The translation of her relics from Lobbes to Binche in the 15th century is celebrated on June 10.

Amalberga of Maubeuge is not to be confused with the virgin Amalberga of Temse (venerated in Ghent, Temse and Munsterbilzen) who died in 772, and whose feast day is July 10 or October 27.

Hagiography
The biography of Amalberga of Maubeuge (:s:la:Vita S. Amalbergae viduae) is probably written by Abbott Hugo of Lobbes (1033–1063) between 1033 and 1048. Apart from a few Merovingian details, her genealogy was copied from another 11th-century hagiography, namely the Martyr story of Catherine of Alexandria. The biographical profile of her legendary husband, duke Witger of Lotharingia, is based on an historical figure from the 10th century, Wigeric of Lotharingia. It is largely considered legendary and unreliable.

References

Literature
 Van Droogenbroeck, F. J., 'Paltsgraaf Wigerik van Lotharingen, inspiratiebron voor de legendarische graaf Witger in de Vita Gudilae', Eigen Schoon en De Brabander 93 (2010) 113-136.
 Van Droogenbroeck, F. J., 'Hugo van Lobbes (1033-1053), auteur van de Vita Amalbergae viduae, Vita S. Reinildis en Vita S. Berlendis', Eigen Schoon en De Brabander 94 (2011) 367-402.
 Van Droogenbroeck, F. J., 'Kritisch onderzoek naar de interacties tussen de Vita S. Gudilae en de Gesta Episcoporum Cameracensium.', Eigen Schoon en De Brabander 95 (2012) 311-346.

7th-century births
690s deaths
Belgian Roman Catholic saints
Benedictine nuns
Christian female saints of the Middle Ages
7th-century Frankish saints
7th-century Frankish nuns